Rheintochter was a German surface-to-air missile developed by Rheinmetall-Borsig during World War II. Its name comes from the mythical Rheintöchter (Rhinemaidens) of Richard Wagner's opera series Der Ring des Nibelungen.

The missile was a multi-stage solid fuelled rocket. It had four small control surfaces, resembling paddles, in the nose, six fins at the after end of the top stage, and four at the end of the main stage. The sustainer motor, located ahead of the  warhead (rather than behind, as is more usual) exhausted through six venturis between the first stage fins.

History 
Rheintochter was ordered in November 1942 by the German army (Heer). Starting in August 1943, 82 test firings were made. An air-launched version was also designed. The operational version was intended to be fired from a ramp or converted gun mount.

The project was cancelled on February 6, 1945.

Examples are on display at the Steven F. Udvar-Hazy Center in Chantilly, Virginia, the Deutsches Museum in Munich, and at the RAF Museum Cosford, UK

Variants 

The initial R1 variant was powered by a two-stage solid-fuel rocket.

The proposed R2 did not offer any improvement over the R1, and was dropped in December 1944.

The R3 model was developed, which had a liquid fuel engine with solid-fuel boosters ("strap-ons"). Only six trial missiles were fired.

Specifications 
 Power plant: RI variant was 2-stage solid fuel; RIII was liquid fuel with solid-fuel boosters
 Length: 
 Diameter: 
 Wing span: 
 Launch weight:  
 Speed: 1,080 km/h (671 mph)
 Warhead:  
 Altitude: R1 8 km
 Guidance system: Radio Command

See also 
 List of World War II guided missiles of Germany
 Enzian

Notes

Sources 
 Christopher, John.  The Race for Hitler's X-Planes.  The Mill, Gloucestershire:  History Press, 2013.
 Ford, Brian J., Secret Weapons, Osprey Publishing, 2011,

External links 

 Smithsonian National Air and Space Museum
 Royal Air Force Museum, Cosford (UK)

World War II guided missiles of Germany
Surface-to-air missiles of Germany